Chalky or Chalkie may refer to:


Nickname
 Chalkie Davies, Welsh rock photographer 
 "Chalky", nickname of Charles Clinton Fleek (1947–1969), United States Army sergeant and recipient of the Medal of Honor
 Chalkie White (disambiguation), a list of people and fictional characters nicknamed "Chalkie" or "Chalky"
 Chalky Wright (1912–1957), American world champion boxer

Places
 Chalky Island (New Zealand)
 Chalky Island (Tasmania), Australia
 Taiari / Chalky Inlet, a fjord on New Zealand's South Island

Other uses
 Chalky (dog),  TV chef Rick Stein's Jack Russell Terrier
 Chalky (comics), a British comic and the title character, created in 1971
 Chalkie, a tyrannical teacher character created by cartoonist Carl Giles

See also
 Chalky Mount, Barbados, a range of hills
 Little Chalky Island, Tasmania, Australia
 Chalkie's Beach, Queensland, Australia

Lists of people by nickname